A Brief History of the Twentieth Century is the first compilation album by Gang of Four. It was released in December 1990. The liner notes are by Greil Marcus.

Track listing 

 Tracks 1-6 are from the album Entertainment! (1979)
 Track 7 is from the Yellow EP (1980)
 Tracks 9-11 are from the album Solid Gold (1981)
 Tracks 8 and 12-13 are from the EP Another Day/Another Dollar (1982)
 Tracks 14-17 and 20 are from the album Songs of the Free (1982)
 Tracks 18-19 are from the album Hard (1983)

References

Gang of Four (band) albums
1990 compilation albums
Warner Records compilation albums